Robert Baba Kuganab-Lem is a Ghanaian politician and member of the Seventh Parliament of the Fourth Republic of Ghana representing the Binduri Constituency in the Upper East Region on the ticket of the National Democratic Congress.

References

Ghanaian MPs 2017–2021
1966 births
Living people
National Democratic Congress (Ghana) politicians